Saltery Bay is an unincorporated community on the Sunshine Coast of southern British Columbia, Canada. It is adjacent to Saltery Bay Provincial Park.

Saltery Bay Ferry Terminal 
The Saltery Bay Ferry Terminal is a BC Ferries terminal that links British Columbia Highway 101 across Jervis Inlet to Earls Cove.

References

External links 

Unincorporated settlements in British Columbia
Populated places in the qathet Regional District
BC Ferries
Ferry terminals in British Columbia